Pwll Du (meaning a black or dark pool or pit) was a village in Monmouthshire, Wales. It was declared a slum in 1960 and demolished in 1963. 
The main employment was provided by nearby limestone quarries and by the iron works in Blaenavon.
The Pwll Du Tunnel from Blaenavon, once the longest horse-powered tramway in Britain, ended near the village.
A pub and the former Welfare Hall, now a school's outdoor pursuits centre, are all that are left standing.

History
Pwll Du was established in the 1820s.
There were two rows of terrace houses, one with 14 houses and the other with 28.
At one time Pwll Du had two pubs, two chapels, a school and a shop.
The Prince of Wales pub spanned the border between Monmouthshire and Brecknockshire.
The two counties had different alcohol licensing laws, and it is said that patrons of the pub would move from one county to the other so they could continue to drink legally.

The 300 residents were miners, quarrymen, ironworkers and their families.
Employment declined from the 1930s and people began to move out.
In 1960 the village was declared a slum.
The mines had closed. The houses were dilapidated and had neither running water nor sewerage.
The houses were demolished in 1963 after the remaining residents had been moved, most of them to Govilon, a village further down the hill.
The Welfare Hall was built in the 1940s, funded by a levy on the villagers. 
It was not torn down and is now a privately owned outdoor pursuits centre.
The Lamb and Fox pub also survived and is now a private residence.

Alexander Cordell wrote several novels about families living and working in this area.
One of the most important caves in Britain, the Ogof Draenen, lies under the area.

Tramroads and quarry
The Pwll Du Tunnel, the longest horse-drawn tram tunnel in Britain, used to terminate near the village.
It connected the Blaenavon Ironworks to limestone quarries at Pwll-Du and Tyla.
The horse-drawn railway through the tunnel was in operation by 1817.
Limestone was taken from the quarry up to the railway by a water-balance lift, using water from a reservoir above.

The tramroad carried cast iron brought through the tunnel from the Blaenavon Ironworks to the Garnddyrys Forge, and wrought iron from the Forge to Llanfoist.
After about 1850 cast iron from Blaenavon was carried over the Dyne Steel Incline and then down Hill's Tramroad.
In 1860 the Garnddyrys works were closed, the forge was relocated to Forgeside, Blaenavon, and the northern branch of the tunnel at Pwll Du was closed.
The limestone quarries closed after the General Strike of 1926.

Notes

Sources

 

Villages in Monmouthshire
Former villages in Wales
Blaenavon